is a Japanese rugby union player, who plays at number 8 or flanker for Canon Eagles and previously Toyota Verblitz. He also represented Japan at international level, and is the second highest try scorer for a forward of all time.

Professional career
He established himself in the side through 2006 but was ruled out of the 2007 Rugby World Cup with a knee injury.

After recovering from injury, he returned to the side and took over Takuro Miuchi as captain in November 2008 by coach John Kirwan, and led the side until the end of the 2011 Rugby World Cup.

After a disappointing tournament for Japan, he was replaced as captain by Toshiaki Hirose and initially left out the squad altogether by new coach Eddie Jones, but soon returned for the 2012 Pacific Nations Cup, and re-established himself as vice captain to Hirose, and was singled out by Jones as one of the few Japanese players who has the attitude and physicality to be able to "smash" players. He dropped off the international scene in 2014.

Kikutani finished his international career as the second highest try scorer of all time by a forward with 32 tries, with only Diego Ormaechea of  having scored more.

At domestic level, Kikutani played most of his career at Toyota Verblitz, and has twice been named in Top League team of the season in 2009–10 and 2012–13. He left the club in December 2013 to join 
Saracens on a training contract, before returning to Japan with the Canon Eagles.

References

External links
 Toyota Verblitz profile 

1980 births
Living people
Japanese rugby union players
Japan international rugby union players
Rugby union number eights
Rugby union flankers
Toyota Verblitz players
Yokohama Canon Eagles players
Saracens F.C. players
Expatriate rugby union players in England
Japanese expatriate rugby union players
Japanese expatriate sportspeople in England
Japan international rugby sevens players